Peers's girdled lizard  or Peers's Nama lizard (Namazonurus peersi) is a species of lizard in the family Cordylidae. It is a small, spiny lizard found in  South Africa.

References

Namazonurus
Reptiles of South Africa
Reptiles described in 1932
Taxa named by John Hewitt (herpetologist)